Matthew Robert Hickey (born 23 September 1991) is an English former first-class cricketer.

Hickey was born at Wandsworth in September 1991 and was educated at Torquay Boys' Grammar School, before going up to Trinity Hall, Cambridge. While studying at Cambridge, he played first-class cricket for Cambridge University from 2011–13, making three appearances against Oxford University in The University Match, scoring 103 runs with a high score of 53 and taking 3 wickets with his left-arm medium pace. In addition to playing for Cambridge University, he also made a single first-class appearances for Cambridge MCCU in 2011 against Middlesex at Fenner's.

Notes and references

External links

1991 births
Living people
People from Wandsworth
People educated at Torquay Boys' Grammar School
Alumni of Trinity Hall, Cambridge
English cricketers
Cambridge MCCU cricketers
Cambridge University cricketers